Year 1457 (MCDLVII) was a common year starting on Saturday (link will display the full calendar) of the Julian calendar.

Events 
 January–December 
 February 11 – After years of captivity and absence from the Ming throne, the Zhengtong Emperor of China is reinstated, as the Tianshun Emperor.
 February 24 – Charles VIII of Sweden is declared deposed. The Archbishop of Sweden, Jöns Bengtsson Oxenstierna, and statesman Erik Axelsson Tott become co-regents of Sweden. The throne is then offered to Christian I of Denmark and Norway.
 March 6 – King James II of Scotland decrees that ". . .  . . ", the first historical mention of the game of golf.
 April 12 – Ştefan cel Mare secures the throne of Moldavia, which he retains for the next 47 years.
 June 23 – Christian I is elected king of Sweden, ending the war between Sweden and Denmark and restoring the Kalmar Union.
June 29 – The Dutch city of Dordrecht is devastated by fire.
 August 14 – The Mainz Psalter, the second major book printed with movable type in the West, the first to be wholly finished mechanically (including colour), and the first to carry a printed date, is printed for the Elector of Mainz.
 September 2 – Battle of Ujëbardha: One of Skanderbeg's most important victories is won against the Ottoman army, in the open field.

 Date unknown 
 Albrechts University is founded at Freiburg im Breisgau.
 Edo Castle is built by Ōta Dōkan in modern-day Tokyo.

Births 
 January 18 – Antonio Trivulzio, seniore, Roman Catholic cardinal (d. 1508)
 January 28 – King Henry VII of England (d. 1509)
 February 2 – Peter Martyr d'Anghiera, Italo-Spanish historian and diplomat (d. 1526)
 February 13 – Mary of Burgundy, sovereign duchess regnant of Burgundy, married to Maximilian I, Holy Roman Emperor (d. 1482)
 August 20 – Seongjong of Joseon, King of Joseon (d. 1494)
 September 21 – Hedwig Jagiellon, Duchess of Bavaria, Polish princess (d. 1502)
 November 16 – Beatrice of Naples, Hungarian queen (d. 1508)
 date unknown
 Jacob Obrecht, Dutch composer (d. 1505)
 George Nevill, Duke of Bedford (d. 1483)
 probable
 Sebastian Brant, German humanist and satirist (d. 1521)
 Filippino Lippi, Florentine painter (d. 1504)
 Thomas West, 8th Baron De La Warr (d. 1525)

Deaths 
 March 14 – Jingtai Emperor of China (b. 1428)
 March 16 – László Hunyadi, Hungarian statesman and warrior (b. 1433)
 May 22 – Saint Rita of Cascia, Italian saint (b. 1381)
 August 1 – Lorenzo Valla, Italian humanist
 August 19 – Andrea del Castagno, Italian painter (b. 1421)
 September 12 – Gabriele Sforza, Archbishop of Milan (b. 1423)
 September 14 – Countess Palatine Margaret of Mosbach, countess consort of Hanau (b. 1432)
 September 22 – Peter II, Duke of Brittany (b. 1418)
 November 3 – Ludwig II, Count of Württemberg-Urach, German noble (b. 1439)
 November 23 – King Ladislaus Posthumus of Bohemia and Hungary (b. 1440)
 December 24 – Danjong of Joseon, King of Joseon (b. 1441)
 date unknown
 Abul-Qasim Babur Mirza, ruler of Khurasan (b. 1422)
 Bartolomeu Perestrello, Portuguese navigator and explorer (b. 1395)

References